Kjetil Saunes (born 22 October 1962 in Ulsteinvik, Norway) is a Norwegian musician (bass), composer and songwriter raised in, and still residing in, Oslo. He is known from a series of album releases and collaborations with musicians like Bjørn Eidsvåg, Ketil Bjørnstad, Kjetil Bjerkestrand, Eivind Aarset, Morten Harket and Unni Wilhelmsen.

Career 
Saunes started his musical career as 19 years old, in a band including Kjetil Bjerkestrand, Anders Viken and Eivind Aarset. His main instrument is the bass. He later worked as a studio musician and arranger, next to his own solo career. In the 80s he played with the KGB, a Christian rock band from Hamar. In addition he has collaborated with artists like Marius Müller, The Cardigans, Ketil Bjørnstad and Unni Wilhelmsen. Saunes has released four solo albums with his own music, lyrics, production and the bulk of the gameplay itself. The music can be characterized as intricate and well produced pop music, with well-written and poetic lyrics in Norwegian.

Discography

Solo albums 
1993: Lystyv (Grappa Music), with Eivind Aarset, Paolo Vinaccia, Per Hillestad, Bugge Wesseltoft, Nils Petter Molvær & Elisabeth Moberg
1996: Fyr (Grappa Musikk)
1999: Arkana (Grappa Musikk)
2008: Måne Blek (Grappa Musikk)

Collaborations 
1992: Til Alle Tider (Norsk Plateproduksjon), with Bjørn Eidsvåg
1993: Poetenes Evangelium (Kirkelig Kulturverksted), with Morten Harket 
1997: Reisetid (September), with Ketil Bjørnstad including Eldbjørg Raknes, Petronella Barker & Henrik Mestad
1998: Électronique Noire (Jazzland, EmArcy), with Eivind Aarset
2001: Syng Du Mi Røst (Grappa musikk), with Kirsten Bråten Berg
2003: Hurricane's Eye (St. Cecilia Music), with Unni Wilhelmsen

References

External links 

1962 births
Living people
People from Ulstein
Jazzland Recordings (1997) artists
Norwegian male singers
Norwegian male bass guitarists
Norwegian rock bass guitarists
Musicians from Oslo
Grappa Music artists